The 2018 Campeonato Brasileiro de Copa Truck is the second season of the Copa Truck.

Teams and drivers

Race calendar and results
The Copa Truck is divided into four parallel championships with two stages (South Truck Cup, Southeast Truck Cup, Midwest Truck Cup and Mercosul Truck Cup), totaling eight stages. And a ninth stage, denominated The Great Final, will define the general champion of the category.

Drivers' Championship

Preliminary rounds

References

External links
  

Copa Truck
Copa Truck